The 10th Filipino Academy of Movie Arts and Sciences Awards Night was held in 1962 for the Outstanding Achievements for the year 1961.

Noli Me Tangere is a movie based on the book of the same title written by the Philippine National Hero Dr.Jose Rizal;  won the most coveted award the FAMAS Award for Best Picture at the 10th FAMAS Awards.  It was also the first time that the Academy gave an award posthumously to the writer.

Awards

Major awards
Winners are listed first and highlighted with boldface.

Special Awardee

 International Prestige Award of Merit
La Campana de Baler

 Dr. Ciriaco Santiago Memorial Award 
Lamberto V. Avellana

References

External links
FAMAS Awards 

FAMAS Award
FAMAS
FAMAS